The Theatre Fest is a festival that takes place every April in the Macedonian National Theatre in Skopje, Republic of North Macedonia. It hosts Macedonian and foreign theatres and lasts five days.

External links 
 Macedonia.co.uk - Events in Macedonia (in English)

Annual events in North Macedonia
Theatre in North Macedonia
Arts festivals in North Macedonia
Theatre festivals in Europe
Spring (season) events in North Macedonia
Festivals in Skopje